The Great Victory or The Great Victory, Wilson or the Kaiser? The Fall of the Hohenzollerns is a 1919 American silent war drama film directed by Charles Miller and starring Creighton Hale, Florence Billings and Helen Ferguson. It was made as anti-German propaganda during World War I, although it was released after the end of the conflict.

Synopsis
A young Alsatian is forced to enlist in the German Army on the outbreak of the war. Appalled by the atrocities committed by his colleagues, including against his own sister, he deserts having fallen in love with an American nurse. Vowing revenge, he travels to the United States and joins the American Army along with other Alsatians. They return to Europe and secure victory.

Partial cast
 Creighton Hale as Conrad Le Brett 
 Florence Billings as Vilma Le Brett 
 Edward Connelly as Paul Le Brett
 Helen Ferguson as Amy Gordon 
 Frank Currier as William Gordon 
 Frederick Truesdell as Woodrow Wilson
 Henry Kolker as Kaiser Wilhelm II 
 Joseph Kilgour as General Von Bissing 
 Margaret McWade as Nurse Edith Cavell 
 Earl Schenck as Lieutenant Ober / Crown Prince 
 Henry Carvill as Count von Bismarck 
 Florence Short as Elaine 
 Baby Ivy Ward as Elaine's Child 
 Andy Clark as Francois 
 James A. Furey as Priest 
 Fred R. Stanton as Sergeant Gross 
 Leo Delaney as Frederick III 
 Fanny Cogan as Empress Victoria 
 Emil Hoch as General von Hindenburg 
 Charles Edwards as Rev. Joseph Wilson 
 May Allen as Mrs. Joseph Wilson 
 Karl Dane as Von Bethmann Hollweg 
 Carl De Mel as Count von Moltke

References

Bibliography
 Laura Petersen Balogh. Karl Dane: A Biography and Filmography. McFarland, 2009.

External links

1919 films
1910s war drama films
American war drama films
Films directed by Charles Miller
American silent feature films
Metro Pictures films
American World War I films
1919 drama films
1910s English-language films
1910s American films
Silent American drama films
Silent war drama films